Upirngiviaaluk formerly Emma Island is an uninhabited island located in the Qikiqtaaluk Region, Nunavut, Canada. It is a Baffin Island offshore island in Hudson Strait. The closest community is Kimmirut.

Other islands in the immediate vicinity include Qikiqtarjuaq and Rabbit Island.

References

Islands of Baffin Island
Islands of Hudson Strait
Uninhabited islands of Qikiqtaaluk Region